The Zafarnāma (Gurmukhi: ਜ਼ਫ਼ਰਨਾਮਾ; , lit. Epistle of Victory) was a spiritual  victory letter sent by Guru Gobind Singh in 1705 to the Mughal Emperor of India, Aurangzeb, after the Battle of Chamkaur. The letter is written in Persian and verse. The version currently in circulation found in the Dasam Granth, the compilation of Guru Gobind Singh’s poetry, is in Gurmukhi script and Persian verse. 
Guru Gobind Singh  sent 5 Singhs including Daya Singh, Dharam Singh and Sambhal Singh with the help of Naib Subedar Haji Sardar Shah to deliver the Zafarnama to Emperor Aurangzeb in Ahmednagar on 5 January 1707, the last day of Ramadaan that year.

Content 
In this letter, Guru Gobind Singh reminds Aurangzeb how he and his soldiers had broken their oaths sworn upon the Qur'an when they promised safe passage to the Guru but launched a hidden attack of an army described as much larger, on forty famished Sikh soldiers. He tells Aurangzeb this was not a battle, it was a slaughter. As such, in spite of losing most of his Sikhs in this attack, he had won a moral victory over the Emperor who had broken his vows to Allah. He also states that despite sending a huge army to capture or kill the Guru, the Mughal forces did not succeed in their mission.

In the 111 verses of this notice, Guru Gobind Singh rebukes Aurangzeb for his weaknesses as a human being and for his excesses as a leader. Guru Gobind Singh also confirms his confidence and his unflinching faith in the Almighty even after suffering extreme personal loss of his father, mother, all four of his sons, and many fellow Sikhs to Aurangzeb's tyranny.
Guru Gobind Singh then invites Aurangzeb to meet him in Kangar village near Bathinda (Punjab) and assures him the Brar tribe will not harm him (Aurangzeb) as they are under his command.
"On the way there will be no danger to your life, for, the whole tribe of Brars accepts my command."

Of the 111 verses, the maximum numbers of 34 verses are to praise God; 32 deal with Aurangzeb’s invitation for the Guru to meet him and the Guru's refusal to meet the Emperor – instead the Guru asks Aurangzeb to visit him; 24 verses detail the events in the Battle of Chamkaur, which took place on 22 December 1704; 15 verses reprove Aurangzeb for breaking promise given by him and by his agents to the Guru; In verses 78 and 79, Guru Gobind Singh had also warned Aurangzeb about the resolve of the Khalsa not to rest till the Mughal Empire is destroyed; 6 verses praise Aurangzeb.

See also 

 Sikh scriptures

References

External links 
 Sri Dasam Granth Sahib: Questions and Answers: The book on Sri Dasam Granth Sahib 
Manuscripts of Zafarnama
Download English Translation of Zafarnama
English Translation of Zafarnama
Zafarnama in Gurmukhi, Perso-Arabic and Latin script with English translations
Epistle of Victory
Hindustan Times, The Zafarnama
Zafarnama Quotes by DHANSIKHI

Dasam Granth
History of Sikhism
Persian-language literature
Indian literature
Indian religious texts
Indian manuscripts